In the philosophy of mathematics, the abstraction of actual infinity involves the acceptance (if the axiom of infinity is included) of infinite entities as given, actual and completed objects. These might include the set of natural numbers, extended real numbers, transfinite numbers, or even an infinite sequence of rational numbers. Actual infinity is to be contrasted with potential infinity, in which a non-terminating process (such as "add 1 to the previous number") produces a sequence with no last element, and where each individual result is finite and is achieved in a finite number of steps. As a result, potential infinity is often formalized using the concept of limit.

Anaximander 

The ancient Greek term for the potential or improper infinite was apeiron (unlimited or indefinite), in contrast to the actual or proper infinite aphorismenon. Apeiron stands opposed to that which has a peras (limit). These notions are today denoted by potentially infinite and actually infinite, respectively.

Anaximander (610–546 BC) held that the apeiron was the principle or main element composing all things. Clearly, the 'apeiron' was some sort of basic substance. Plato's notion of the apeiron is more abstract, having to do with indefinite variability. The main dialogues where Plato discusses the 'apeiron' are the late dialogues Parmenides and the Philebus.

Aristotle
Aristotle sums up the views of his predecessors on infinity as follows:
"Only the Pythagoreans place the infinite among the objects of sense (they do not regard number as separable from these), and assert that what is outside the heaven is infinite. Plato, on the other hand, holds that there is no body outside (the Forms are not outside because they are nowhere), yet that the infinite is present not only in the objects of sense but in the Forms also." (Aristotle)

The theme was brought forward by Aristotle's consideration of the apeiron—in the context of mathematics and physics (the study of nature):

"Infinity turns out to be the opposite of what people say it is. It is not 'that which has nothing beyond itself' that is infinite, but 'that which always has something beyond itself'." (Aristotle)Belief in the existence of the infinite comes mainly from five considerations:
 From the nature of time – for it is infinite.
 From the division of magnitudes – for the mathematicians also use the notion of the infinite.
 If coming to be and passing away do not give out, it is only because that from which things come to be is infinite.
 Because the limited always finds its limit in something, so that there must be no limit, if everything is always limited by something different from itself.
 Most of all, a reason which is peculiarly appropriate and presents the difficulty that is felt by everybody – not only number but also mathematical magnitudes and what is outside the heaven are supposed to be infinite because they never give out in our thought. (Aristotle)

Aristotle postulated that an actual infinity was impossible, because if it were possible, then something would have attained infinite magnitude, and would be "bigger than the heavens." However, he said, mathematics relating to infinity was not deprived of its applicability by this impossibility, because mathematicians did not need the infinite for their theorems, just a finite, arbitrarily large magnitude.

Aristotle's potential–actual distinction
Aristotle handled the topic of infinity in Physics and in Metaphysics. He distinguished between actual and potential infinity. Actual infinity is completed and definite, and consists of infinitely many elements. Potential infinity is never complete: elements can be always added, but never infinitely many.

Aristotle distinguished between infinity with respect to addition and division.

"As an example of a potentially infinite series in respect to increase, one number can always be added after another in the series that starts 1,2,3,... but the process of adding more and more numbers cannot be exhausted or completed."With respect to division, a potentially infinite sequence of divisions might start, for example, 1, 1/2, 1/4, 1/8, 1/16, but the process of division cannot be exhausted or completed.

Aristotle also argued that Greek mathematicians knew the difference among the actual infinite and a potential one, but they "do not need the [actual] infinite and do not use it" (Phys. III 2079 29).

Scholastic, Renaissance and Enlightenment thinkers
The overwhelming majority of scholastic philosophers adhered to the motto Infinitum actu non datur. This means there is only a (developing, improper, "syncategorematic") potential infinity but not a (fixed, proper, "categorematic") actual infinity. There were exceptions, however, for example in England.

It is well known that in the Middle Ages all scholastic philosophers advocate Aristotle's "infinitum actu non datur" as an irrefutable principle. (G. Cantor)

Actual infinity exists in number, time and quantity. (J. Baconthorpe [9, p. 96])

During the Renaissance and by early modern times the voices in favor of actual infinity were rather rare.

The continuum actually consists of infinitely many indivisibles (G. Galilei [9, p. 97])

I am so in favour of actual infinity. (G.W. Leibniz [9, p. 97])

However, the majority of pre-modern thinkers agreed with the well-known quote of Gauss:

I protest against the use of infinite magnitude as something completed, which is never permissible in mathematics. Infinity is merely a way of speaking, the true meaning being a limit which certain ratios approach indefinitely close, while others are permitted to increase without restriction. (C.F. Gauss [in a letter to Schumacher, 12 July 1831])

Modern era 
Actual infinity is now commonly accepted. The drastic change was initialized by Bolzano and Cantor in the 19th century.

Bernard Bolzano, who introduced the notion of set (in German: Menge), and Georg Cantor, who introduced set theory, opposed the general attitude. Cantor distinguished three realms of infinity: (1) the infinity of God (which he called the "absolutum"), (2) the infinity of reality (which he called "nature") and (3) the transfinite numbers and sets of mathematics.

A multitude which is larger than any finite multitude, i.e., a multitude with the property that every finite set [of members of the kind in question] is only a part of it, I will call an infinite multitude. (B. Bolzano [2, p. 6])

Accordingly I distinguish an eternal uncreated infinity or absolutum, which is due to God and his attributes, and a created infinity or transfinitum, which has to be used wherever in the created nature an actual infinity has to be noticed, for example, with respect to, according to my firm conviction, the actually infinite number of created individuals, in the universe as well as on our earth and, most probably, even in every arbitrarily small extended piece of space. (Georg Cantor) (G. Cantor [8, p. 252])

The numbers are a free creation of human mind. (R. Dedekind [3a, p. III])

One proof is based on the notion of God. First, from the highest perfection of God, we infer the possibility of the creation of the transfinite, then, from his all-grace and splendor, we infer the necessity that the creation of the transfinite in fact has happened. (G. Cantor [3, p. 400])

Cantor distinguished two types of actual infinity; the transfinite and the absolute, about which he affirmed:
These concepts are to be strictly differentiated, insofar the former is, to be sure, infinite, yet capable of increase, whereas the latter is incapable of increase and is therefore indeterminable as a mathematical concept. This mistake we find, for example, in Pantheism. (G. Cantor, Über verschiedene Standpunkte in bezug auf das aktuelle Unendliche, in Gesammelte Abhandlungen mathematischen und philosophischen Inhalts, pp. 375, 378)

Current mathematical practice 
Actual infinity is now commonly accepted, because mathematicians have learned how to construct algebraic statements using it. For example, one may write down a symbol, with the verbal description that " stands for completed (countable) infinity". This symbol may be added as an ur-element to any set. One may also provide axioms that define addition, multiplication and inequality; specifically, ordinal arithmetic, such that expressions like  can be interpreted as "any natural number is less than completed infinity". The ability to define ordinal numbers in a consistent, meaningful way, renders much of the debate moot; whatever personal opinion one may hold about infinity or constructability, the existence of a rich theory for working with infinities using the tools of algebra and logic is clearly in hand.

Opposition from the Intuitionist school
The mathematical meaning of the term "actual" in actual infinity is synonymous with definite, completed, extended or existential, but not to be mistaken for physically existing. The question of whether natural or real numbers form definite sets is therefore independent of the question of whether infinite things exist physically in nature.

Proponents of intuitionism, from Kronecker onwards, reject the claim that there are actually infinite mathematical objects or sets. Consequently, they reconstruct the foundations of mathematics in a way that does not assume the existence of actual infinities.  On the other hand, constructive analysis does accept the existence of the completed infinity of the integers.

For intuitionists, infinity is described as potential; terms synonymous with this notion are becoming or constructive. For example, Stephen Kleene describes the notion of a Turing machine tape as "a linear 'tape', (potentially) infinite in both directions." To access memory on the tape, a Turing machine moves a read head along it in finitely many steps: the tape is therefore only "potentially" infinite, since — while there is always the ability to take another step — infinity itself is never actually reached.

Mathematicians generally accept actual infinities. Georg Cantor is the most significant mathematician who defended actual infinities, equating the Absolute Infinite with God. He decided that it is possible for natural and real numbers to be definite sets, and that if one rejects the axiom of Euclidean finiteness (that states that actualities, singly and in aggregates, are necessarily finite), then one is not involved in any contradiction.

The present-day conventional finitist interpretation of ordinal and cardinal numbers is that they consist of a collection of special symbols, and an associated formal language, within which statements may be made. All such statements are necessarily finite in length. The soundness of the manipulations is founded only on the basic principles of a formal language: term algebras, term rewriting, and so on. More abstractly, both (finite) model theory and proof theory offer the needed tools to work with infinities. One does not have to "believe" in infinity in order to write down algebraically valid expressions employing symbols for infinity.

Classical set theory
The philosophical problem of actual infinity concerns whether the notion is coherent and epistemically sound.

Classical set theory accepts the notion of actual, completed infinities.  However, some finitist philosophers of mathematics and constructivists object to the notion.If the positive number n becomes infinitely great, the expression 1/n goes to naught (or gets infinitely small). In this sense one speaks of the improper or potential infinite. In sharp and clear contrast the set just considered is a readily finished, locked infinite set, fixed in itself, containing infinitely many exactly defined elements (the natural numbers) none more and none less. (A. Fraenkel [4, p. 6])Thus the conquest of actual infinity may be considered an expansion of our scientific horizon no less revolutionary than the Copernican system or than the theory of relativity, or even of quantum and nuclear physics. (A. Fraenkel [4, p. 245])

To look at the universe of all sets not as a fixed entity but as an entity capable of "growing", i.e., we are able to "produce" bigger and bigger sets. (A. Fraenkel et al. [5, p. 118])

(Brouwer) maintains that a veritable continuum which is not denumerable can be obtained as a medium of free development; that is to say, besides the points which exist (are ready) on account of their definition by laws, such as e, pi, etc. other points of the continuum are not ready but develop as so-called choice sequences. (A. Fraenkel et al. [5, p. 255])

Intuitionists reject the very notion of an arbitrary sequence of integers, as denoting something finished and definite as illegitimate. Such a sequence is considered to be a growing object only and not a finished one. (A. Fraenkel et al. [5, p. 236])

Until then, no one envisioned the possibility that infinities come in different sizes, and moreover, mathematicians had no use for "actual infinity." The arguments using infinity, including the Differential Calculus of Newton and Leibniz, do not require the use of infinite sets. (T. Jech )

Owing to the gigantic simultaneous efforts of Frege, Dedekind and Cantor, the infinite was set on a throne and revelled in its total triumph. In its daring flight the infinite reached dizzying heights of success. (D. Hilbert [6, p. 169])

One of the most vigorous and fruitful branches of mathematics [...] a paradise created by Cantor from which nobody shall ever expel us [...] the most admirable blossom of the mathematical mind and altogether one of the outstanding achievements of man's purely intellectual activity. (D. Hilbert on set theory [6])

Finally, let us return to our original topic, and let us draw the conclusion from all our reflections on the infinite. The overall result is then: The infinite is nowhere realized. Neither is it present in nature nor is it admissible as a foundation of our rational thinking – a remarkable harmony between being and thinking. (D. Hilbert [6, 190])

Infinite totalities do not exist in any sense of the word (i.e., either really or ideally). More precisely, any mention, or purported mention, of infinite totalities is, literally, meaningless. (A. Robinson [10, p. 507])

Indeed, I think that there is a real need, in formalism and elsewhere, to link our understanding of mathematics with our understanding of the physical world.  (A. Robinson)

Georg Cantor's grand meta-narrative, Set Theory, created by him almost singlehandedly in the span of about fifteen years, resembles a piece of high art more than a scientific theory. (Y. Manin )

Thus, exquisite minimalism of expressive means is used by Cantor to achieve a sublime goal: understanding infinity, or rather infinity of infinities. (Y. Manin )

There is no actual infinity, that the Cantorians have forgotten and have been trapped by contradictions. (H. Poincaré [Les mathématiques et la logique III, Rev. métaphys. morale 14 (1906) p. 316])

When the objects of discussion are linguistic entities [...] then that collection of entities may vary as a result of discussion about them. A consequence of this is that the "natural numbers" of today are not the same as the "natural numbers" of yesterday. (D. Isles )

There are at least two different ways of looking at the numbers: as a completed infinity and as an incomplete infinity... regarding the numbers as an incomplete infinity offers a viable and interesting alternative to regarding the numbers as a completed infinity, one that leads to great simplifications in some areas of mathematics and that has strong connections with problems of computational complexity. (E. Nelson )

During the renaissance, particularly with Bruno, actual infinity transfers from God to the world. The finite world models of contemporary science clearly show how this power of the idea of actual infinity has ceased with classical (modern) physics. Under this aspect, the inclusion of actual infinity into mathematics, which explicitly started with G. Cantor only towards the end of the last century, seems displeasing. Within the intellectual overall picture of our century ... actual infinity brings about an impression of anachronism. (P. Lorenzen)

See also
 Limit (mathematics)
 Cardinality of the continuum

References

Sources
 "Infinity" at The MacTutor History of Mathematics archive, treating the history of the notion of infinity, including the problem of actual infinity.
 Aristotle, Physics 
 Bernard Bolzano, 1851, Paradoxien des Unendlichen, Reclam, Leipzig.
 Bernard Bolzano 1837, Wissenschaftslehre, Sulzbach.
 Georg Cantor in E. Zermelo (ed.) 1966, Gesammelte Abhandlungen mathematischen und philosophischen Inhalts, Olms, Hildesheim.
 Richard Dedekind in 1960 Was sind und was sollen die Zahlen?, Vieweg, Braunschweig.
 Adolf Abraham Fraenkel 1923, Einleitung in die Mengenlehre, Springer, Berlin.
 Adolf Abraham Fraenkel, Y. Bar-Hillel, A. Levy 1984, Foundations of Set Theory, 2nd edn., North Holland, Amsterdam New York.
 Stephen C. Kleene 1952 (1971 edition, 10th printing), Introduction to Metamathematics, North-Holland Publishing Company, Amsterdam New York. .
 H. Meschkowski 1981, Georg Cantor: Leben, Werk und Wirkung (2. Aufl.), BI, Mannheim.
 H. Meschkowski, W. Nilson (Hrsg.) 1991, Georg Cantor – Briefe, Springer, Berlin.
 Abraham Robinson 1979, Selected Papers, Vol. 2, W.A.J. Luxemburg, S. Koerner (Hrsg.), North Holland, Amsterdam.

Infinity
Concepts in metaphysics
Philosophy of mathematics